The blonde versus brunette rivalry is a rivalry—whether real, imagined, or fictional—between women with blonde hair and those with brown hair. (The color of brown hair is often called brunette). In popular culture and everyday conversation, the words blonde and brunette are sometimes used as nouns to refer to women by these two hair colors. This supposed rivalry is a common fictional theme in books, magazine articles, film, and television.

Competitive events

An example of a competitive event are the blonde vs. brunette chess matches that began in 2011 as part of the World Chess Tournament held in Moscow.  The match was hosted by the Botvinnik Central Chess Club and featured two teams of young girls, blondes dressed in light colors and brunettes dressed in dark colors. This division is a play on the fact that chess is a game played using light and dark pieces. All of the contestants had to prove a degree of expertise to participate.  The inaugural 2011 match was won by the brunettes who also went on to win the 2016, 2018, and 2019 matches. The team of blondes, by comparison, defeated the brunettes in 2012, 2014, 2015, and 2017. The 2013 match, also held at the Central Chess Club, resulted in a tie score.

It was April 1st and the world's top chess players were involved in the thrilling finale of the Candidates Tournament in London. But at the same time the Central Chess Club in Moscow was the venue of fierce fighting between Blondes and Brunettes who set out to determine the prevailing color. This was the third match of the ladies. Two years ago Brunettes won, but a year later the Blondes struck back. The third tournament was seen as an opportunity to claim the supremacy of one color over another. The girls were motivated, exchanging punches round after round, but when the dust has cleared the overall score was a 50:50 tie! The claim of supremacy will be postponed until the next meeting.

The existence of the blonde vs. brunette rivalry in the U.S. society dates back to at least 1875 when the first female professional baseball players were assigned to teams according to their hair color.  Baseball historian John Thorn notes that blonde and brunette baseball teams barnstormed the country in the late 1800s. A 1924 newspaper article referenced a female swimming meet and listed, among the many events, a "blonde vs. brunette" relay race, that was "Won by the blondes". A more contemporary example is the gridiron football game called blondes vs. brunettes powderpuff football, a charity event that raises money for the Alzheimer's Association. The annual contests were started in the fall of 2005, in Washington D.C.  The games have received considerable publicity to include feature articles in The Washington Post and are now played in 16 cities around the United States.
In some cases, blondes and brunettes on the same team may compete against each other.  Anson Dorrance the women's soccer coach at the University of North Carolina is known for dividing his team into blondes and brunettes and then having them compete against each other.  Losers have been forced to stand in front of the goal facing the rear of the net while the winners take penalty shots against their posteriors. Dorrance, in his years of coaching female athletes, claims to have learned that women are motivated differently from males and that his "blondes vs. brunettes drill" worked with his female team because it was a "matter of pride".  

Tug of war events have also featured teams of blondes and brunettes competing against each other. During a 1918 picnic in Ohio, a tug of war between blondes and brunettes was "Won by the blondes (They stripped the brunettes off the rope against a tree like beads off a string.)" Sports writer Pete Axthelm refereed a 1978 tug of war between blonde and brunette women at a Kentucky charity event, declaring the blonde team, led by Anita Madden, winners of the event.

In the media and entertainment industry
The most enduring blonde vs. brunette rivalry in American culture may exist in the comic book industry where blonde Betty Cooper and brunette Veronica Lodge have been engaged in a mostly friendly competition for over 70 years.  The teenage girls form two-thirds of a blonde vs. brunette love triangle that is completed by their high school classmate and object of their affection, Archie Andrews.  As Archie's next door neighbor in the fictional town of Riverdale, the blonde and blue-eyed Betty Cooper is portrayed in the comic book series as a wholesome, popular, middle-class girl.  Her high school friend and chief competitor for Archie's affection is the vain, spoiled, upper-class brunette Veronica Lodge. Despite their rivalry they remain good friends.  Other comics have used a similar construct where two girls compete for the affections of a young man and the blonde girl is the "good girl, while her brunette rival is the bad girl."  The comic book industry's blonde vs. brunette rivalry over a male has been replicated in other forms of media, including television.

In a November 16, 2011 article titled "Blondes vs. Brunettes: TV Shows with Betty and Veronica-Style Love Triangles", media critic Tucker Cummings cited several TV shows that featured a "classic war between blonde and brunette love interests."  Typically, she wrote, "the blonde (is) stable, and typifies the 'girl next door,' while (the) ... brunette, is haughty, and a bit more exotic."  Shows cited by Cummings that feature blondes and brunettes competing for a man include: The Office (where blonde-haired Pam Beesly (played by Jenna Fischer) competes with brunette Karen Filipelli (played by Rashida Jones) for the attention of Jim Halpert), Suits (where blonde Jenny Griffith (played by Vanessa Ray) competes with brunette Rachel Zane (played by Meghan Markle) for the attention of Mike Ross (played by Patrick J. Adams)), and Dexter (where blonde Rita Bennett (played by Julie Benz) and brunette Lila West (played by Jaime Murray) fight for the affections of Dexter Morgan, the titular character played by Michael C. Hall).

Popular examples
Three's Company, an ABC sitcom that ran from 1977 to 1984 also featured a blonde and brunette triangle. The blonde, Chrissy Snow, was played by Suzanne Somers and the brunette, Janet Wood, was played by Joyce DeWitt.  The man in the middle, Jack Tripper, was played by John Ritter.  Somers and DeWitt were continually faced with media stories that described both an on and off-screen "rivalry" between the two co-stars. Both women repeatedly denied the stories and attempted to dispel "the myth that women, especially blondes and brunettes, can't get along in Hollywood."  This show was based on the British sitcom Man About the House, which likewise had brunette Paula Wilcox and blonde Sally Thomsett and Richard O'Sullivan as the man in the middle.

A contrasting perspective on the Hollywood blonde vs. brunette rivalry was offered up by the dark-haired Teri Hatcher in a 1994 interview while she was starring in Lois & Clark: The New Adventures of Superman, "I love that there are no blondes on our show. You see so many shows with so many blondes, and isn't everyone
sick of that?"

At the same time ABC was running the Three's Company sitcom, it was also running Dynasty, a primetime soap opera. The show starred John Forsythe as Blake Carrington, an oil tycoon embroiled in a love triangle that featured his blonde wife Krystle Carrington (Linda Evans) and his ex-wife, brunette Alexis Carrington Colby (Joan Collins).  During the show's 10-year run the women had a number of fights.  The spectacle of two middle-aged women captured in a catfight during primetime boosted the show's ratings considerably.  Feminist author and cultural critic Susan J. Douglas believed that the shows emphasis on the male lead character, highlighted by women fighting over him, confirmed the traditional patriarchal role of men in society.  Notwithstanding, Douglas and other feminists were not only huge fans of the show but were captivated by the sight of two women engaged in a catfight.  Douglas even suggested that in popular culture, the "purest" form of a catfight was between a blonde and a brunette.Dynasty upped the ante ... On one side was the blonde stay at home Krystal Carrington ... in the other corner was the most delicious bitch ever seen on television, the dark haired, scheming, career vixen, Alexis Carrington Colby ... Krystal just wanted to make her husband happy; Alexis wanted to control the world.  How could you not love a catfight between these two?

During Dynastys run, Collins co-hosted Blondes vs. Brunettes for ABC. The show featured a number of skits that gently poked fun at popular culture's blonde vs. brunette rivalry.  The final skit featured Collins and co-host Morgan Fairchild in their elderly years offering a greeting to each other.

Matching blondes and brunettes against each other, especially as romantic rivals, is a Hollywood technique that extends back to at least the early 1930s.  In a 1932 interview with an Australian newspaper, Hollywood director Dorothy Arzner stated that lead women and women in supporting roles must always have different hair color to accentuate the contrasting beauty of each type.  Arzner also stated that blondes were usually cast as the volatile types while brunettes are cast as the more serious and emotional types. Using hair color in the casting process, has sometimes resulted in Hollywood altering versions of established characters found in other media forms. As an example, in the 1936 Flash Gordon serial, blonde Jean Rogers was cast as Dale Arden who had been portrayed as a brunette in the Flash Gordon comic strips.  However, since the producers had recently cast brunette Priscilla Lawson as Dale Arden's nemesis, Princess Aura, the decision was made to cast a blonde in the role of Arden to help the audience separate between the two women.

Arraying blondes against brunettes, is not unique to the American film industry.  The British film company Hammer Films produced a 1967 movie that took the blonde vs. brunette concept to an extreme. The film Slave Girls (also released under the title Prehistoric Women) starred Martine Beswick in the role of Kari, the queen of a tribe of brunettes who had enslaved a tribe of blondes.  Their existence was disrupted by the arrival of a male explorer who discovered the two tribes by means of a time portal.  Witnessing the brunette's cruel treatment of the blondes, he rejected Beswick's advances and was subsequently enslaved himself.  He soon discovered a group of men who were also held in bondage.  He eventually led a rebellion where the blondes defeated the brunettes, Beswick was killed, and the explorer managed to escape back through the portal.  The production has been described as one of the most bizarre films ever released.

An eccentric and unloved Hammer film that uses a blondes vs. brunettes scenario. — The Hammer Vault

Idiotic Hammer Film in which the Great White Hunter stumbles into a lost Amazon civilization where blondes have been enslaved by brunettes.  Honest!  Nevertheless it has developed a cult following due to Beswick's commanding, sensual performance as the tribe's leader. — Leonard Maltin's 2010 Movie Guide

The French reality TV program Les Gladiatrices featured 10 young bikini-clad women wrestling each other in oil, divided into teams of blondes and brunettes.

Although many countries have used the blonde vs. brunette construct in the media and entertainment industries, the French daily newspaper Le Monde believes that the phenomenon is more prevalent in the United States. In a 2012 article, Le Monde argued that American TV has almost, without exception, characterized blonde women as having the positive values of purity, goodness, and sincerity, frequently at the expense of their brunette counterparts. The article provided several examples:

Bewitched – Samantha Stevens, a blonde witch who is the perfect hostess and wife. In a comic twist the actress Elizabeth Montgomery who played Samantha also portrayed her dark haired cousin Serena, who embodies mostly negative qualities.
Dynasty – Blonde Krystal (played by Linda Evans), matched against brunette Alexis Carrington (played by British actress Joan Collins).
V – The sci-fi series, in both the original series in 1984 and the 2009 remake, featured an intelligent, humanistic blonde battling a brunette who was the leader of the alien cannibals.
The article argues that in recent years, the American TV industry has begun to move away from the positive blonde stereotype and has begun to portray brunettes in a more favorable manner.

Other film and TV examples
Other notable films and TV shows that used an obvious blonde vs. brunette set-up or was perceived as using such by the media include:
A Thief in Paradise. Directed by George Fitzmaurice the movie includes a polo match between a team of brunettes and another team of blondes, each attired in bathing suits.
The Bachelor.  Season 14 featured Jake Pavelka as the worthy man and was advertised by CBS as ""It's blondes vs. brunettes in the first sexy, barefoot football scrimmage in Bachelor history!" The brief football game followed a dinner held inside a mansion.  Dividing the teams up evenly into blondes and brunettes was Pavelka's suggestion to the female contestants.  Some critics were dismissive of the season premiere's set-up:  "In what sounds like a 1962 frat boy's fantasy, it's soon a barefoot, evening attired brunettes versus blondes football scrimmage."

Blonde or Brunette.  Adolphe Menjou stars in this 1927 silent film comedy as a businessman who must choose between his blonde wife, played by Greta Nissen and a dark haired rival played by Arlette Marchal. Although there is no physical confrontation between the two women, one film critic headlined the movie's review by saying "Blonde and Brunette Fight it Out in This Film".
Fort Ti. Joan Vohs and Phyllis Fowler fight for the affections of George Montgomery.  Advertisements for the film showed Vohs and Taylor captured in what was referred to as blonde vs brunette fight.
Gentlemen Prefer Blondes. Based on the 1925 novel by Anita Loos (1927 sequel: But Gentlemen Marry Brunettes), the blonde and brunette stars of the film, Jane Russell and Marilyn Monroe, are friends not rivals, yet the film, as the novel did before, comically raised the issue of sexual desirability based on a woman's hair color.
 Hot Blood. A 1956 musical drama starring Jane Russell and Cornel Wilde where Wilde is tricked by his brother into an disposed marriage with tempestuous Annie Caldash, played by Russell. "One of the liveliest scenes in the movie is a hair pulling battle, blonde vs brunette, when Jane encounters a rival for her hubby's affections ... and a free-for-all with blonde Helen Westcott follows."  

One Million Years B.C. While the movie includes a well-known fight scene between blonde Raquel Welch and brunette Martine Beswick, the primary aspect of the "rivalry" was the juxtaposition of an intellectually superior, generous, peaceful, and compassionate tribe of blue-eyed blondes, which Welch was a member of, and a primitive, self-centered, violent tribe of dark eyed brunettes, of which Beswick was a member. The confrontation between the two women occurred soon after Welch joined the brunette tribe as a newly found mate of one of the tribe's male members, arousing the jealousy of Beswick. The well-choreographed fight between the blonde, barefoot Welch, clad in a bikini top and loin cloth bottom, and the barefoot, dark-haired, and similarly attired Beswick, has drawn the continual attention of reviewers and critics since the movie's 1966 release.
  Total Recall.  1990 science fiction film where Sharon Stone plays the role of Lori, the blonde wife of Doug Quaid, played by  Arnold Schwarzenegger and brunette Rachel Ticotin plays the role of Melina, Quaid's dark haired lover on the planet Mars.  In the film's opening scene, Quaid wakes up in bed one morning after having one of his recurring dreams about living on Mars.  Lori, who is familiar with his dreams asks him if "the brunette" was there in the dream with him.  When Quaid subsequently travels to Mars, he meets Melina, the brunette in his dreams, who he now realizes is an old lover from his past trip to the planet.  Melina greets him by looking at his crotch and says "Whatcha been feeding that thing?" Quaid responds "Blondes", in reference to his wife on Earth, Lori. Melina rubs against him and responds "I think it's still hungry." Later, Lori and Melina capture in a brutal fistfight. Quaid, who was knocked out before the fight, recovers, sees that Lori is about to kill Melina and shoots her dead.  Melina regains her consciousness and looking at the dead blonde says "That was your wife?  What a bitch." A 2012 remake of the film featured Kate Beckinsale and Jessica Biel, both brunettes.  Among other criticisms of the movie, several critics faulted the movie for casting two dark haired women in the lead roles and ignoring "the traditional Hollywood polarities of blonde and brunette." "Beckinsale moves like a cat, but she's boring. Biel is similarly underwhelming, and why are they both played by brunettes ... it's hard to tell them apart."
 In 2003, a series of Miller Lite television commercials played upon the rivalry by bringing back its "Great Taste/Less Filling" campaign in titillating yet controversial fashion. The campaign, entitled "Catfight," featured two beautiful young women engaging in the titular conflict over their preferred quality of Miller Lite, a scenario shown to be a fantasy conjured by two men drinking the beer. Blonde Tanya Ballinger preferred its great taste while brunette Kitana Baker enjoyed that it was less filling compared to other light beers. Some critics noted the campaign's main characters, who share a romantic kiss in an extended, uncensored version of the original ad, were blonde and brunette.

Research and studies 

A 2008 study found that men in Greater London, England preferred dark haired women rather than women with blonde hair. A 2018 study based on University of Florida students found that men prefer brunette women over blonde women. 
These studies offered differing explanations as to why the men in their samples preferred dark-haired women. Worthham, et al. (2018) propose that stabilizing selection (preference for people with normal appearances) may be responsible for the male preference of dark haired women. These authors noted that, while women from different geographic regions varied their preferences in male hair color, men did not vary in their preference for female hair color across regions. However Swami, et al. (2008) have posited that men may prefer women with dark hair because they are predominant in the fashion and modelling industries, or because they may be perceived as healthier or more fertile than blonde women.

In a 2012 interview with NBC News, Lisa Walker, chair of the sociology department at the University of North Carolina, explained that hair color "absolutely" plays a role in the way people are treated. A Cornell University study showed that blonde waitresses receive larger tips than brunettes, even when controlling for other variables such as age, breast size, height and weight.

The local NBC news affiliate in Charlotte tested Walker's theory by asking a natural blonde to walk around the Charlotte business area, drop a scarf and keep going.  The volunteer did it 20 times as a blonde and then 20 times wearing a brunette wig. As a blonde, every time she dropped the scarf a bystander picked it up for her, but when wearing a dark haired wig, people simply mentioned that the scarf was dropped or ignored it altogether, only occasionally picking the scarf up for her.

A well-publicized 2011 University of Westminster study, however, evaluated how men perceived women who entered a London nightclub as a blonde or a brunette.  The study, published in the Scandinavian Journal of Psychology, used the same woman and had her dye her hair a different color for each visit.  After spending some time in the club, she departed and then researchers entered the club and interviewed the men who had engaged her in conversation.  The results showed that, as a blonde, she was more likely to be approached for conversation than as a brunette. However, when the researchers interviewed the men who spoke to her, the men rated her more intelligent and attractive as a brunette than as a blonde. Many news organizations covered the story as evidence that blondes were not preferred over brunettes.

In March 2016, a study by the Ohio State University was published in the Economics Bulletin. According to Jay Zagorsky, author of the study, the results show that: "the average IQ of blondes was actually slightly higher than those with other hair colors, but that finding isn't statistically significant." He adds: "I don't think you can say with certainty that blondes are smarter than others, but you can definitely say they are not any dumber."

Another study by the University of Tampa, which also used male and female students, found male students preferred brunette women over blonde women by 40%, while female students preferred brunette women over blonde women by 48% more.

According to Lora Jacobi and Thomas Cash, it has also been shown that blonde women overestimated the percentage of men who would choose blonde hair as their ideal hair color. Among blonde women in their study, 92.9 percent rated blond hair as ideal, with half believing that men would choose so as well. In reality, only 34.8 percent of men said they preferred women with blond hair.

See also

 Blonde stereotype
 Colorism
 Discrimination based on hair texture
 Human hair color
 Human skin color
 Melanin
 Prejudice and discrimination against redheads

References

Blond hair
Brown hair
Women in society
Women's culture
Rivalry